Sallie Ann Glassman (born 1954) is an American practitioner of Vodou, a writer, and an artist. She was born in Kennebunkport, Maine and is a self-described "Ukrainian Jew from Maine."
Glassman has been practicing Vodou in New Orleans since 1977. In 1995, she became one of few white Americans to have been ordained via the traditional Haitian initiation. She owns the Island of Salvation Botanica, an art gallery with both religious supplies, and Haitian and local artworks.

Art
Glassman's art is both esoteric and syncretic. She has produced two major non-traditional tarot packs: the Enochian Tarot, which is derived from the Enochian magical system of Elizabethan magician Doctor John Dee, and the New Orleans Voodoo Tarot, which replaces the standard four tarot suits with depictions of the spirits of the major strands of Vodou (Petro, Congo, Rada) and Santería practices.

In 1992, Glassman published a set of tarot cards called the New Orleans Voodoo Tarot. The cards depict black people, which was unusual for the time. The cards feature prominent Orisha divinities (Obatala, Oshun, Ogun, Yemaya, and Shango), classical Haitian Vodou spirits (Damballah-Wedo, Ezili-Freda, and Guede), and priests of Louisiana Voodoo such as Marie Laveau and Dr. John.

The tarot cards came with a book co-written with Louis Martinié, an advocate for New Orleans style Voodoo in the spectrum of New World religious practices.

Media
Glassman has lectured and received international television, radio, and magazine coverage, including a front-page article in The New York Times, and a feature on World News Tonight.

In an MSNBC interview, Glassman claimed she cured her own cancer using Vodou in 2003.

She appeared in the 2006 film Hexing a Hurricane. Her New Orleans Voodoo Tarot was also an influence on the first album by the band Sun God.

Bibliography

References

External links

1954 births
Living people
American spiritual writers
American people of Ukrainian-Jewish descent
American Voodoo practitioners
Louisiana Voodoo
Tarotologists
Religious leaders from Louisiana
Writers from Maine
Writers from New Orleans
American women non-fiction writers
21st-century American women